Broughton Rangers were one of the twenty-one rugby clubs which met at the George Hotel, Huddersfield, in 1895 to form the Northern Rugby Football Union. They were originally based in Broughton, Salford, but in 1933 moved to Gorton, Manchester to play at the Belle Vue Stadium, and were renamed Belle Vue Rangers in 1946. The club folded in 1955. In 2005, local businessman Stefan Hopewell attempted to resurrect the club and now owns the intellectual property to Broughton Rangers and Belle Vue Rangers.

History

1877–1905: Foundation

The club was founded in 1877 as Broughton and added Rangers for its second season. The club's headquarters was the Bridge Inn on Lower Broughton Road and home games were played at Wheater's Field. On 15 December 1888, Rangers lost to New Zealand Natives 8–0. From 1892 the headquarters was the Grosvenor Hotel on the corner of Great Clowes Street and Clarence Street.

A motion to join the Northern Union was moved by the club captain and carried unanimously. Broughton Rangers was one of 21 clubs which met at the George Hotel, Huddersfield on 29 August 1895 and formed the Northern Rugby Football Union. Broughton built on winning the Lancashire League in 1896–97 and 1898–99 by becoming the first champions of the Northern Union. When the Lancashire and Yorkshire leagues amalgamated in 1901–02; Rangers' form was so outstanding that by February the championship was guaranteed. The same year, Broughton won the Challenge Cup beating Salford 25–0 at Rochdale in front of 15,006 spectators. Rangers won the East Lancashire League that season after finishing 12 points ahead of second-placed Salford.

1906–1917: Early success
Broughton Rangers became the first club to win the Championship and the Northern Union Challenge Cup in the same season in 1901-02.In the 1902 Challenge Cup final Rangers captain Bob Wilson became the first player to score three tries in a final. Broughton Rangers appeared in successive Lancashire Cup Finals, in 1906–07 and 1907–08, beating Warrington 15–6 at Central Park, Wigan but losing to Oldham 16–9 at Rochdale 12 months later. The Rangers reached the top-four semi-finals in 1907–08, losing to All Four Cups winners Hunslet.

Broughton Rangers lost 14–20 to New Zealand during the 1907–1908 New Zealand rugby tour of Australia and Great Britain on Saturday 19 October 1907, the match attracted a crowd of 24,000, New Zealand led early in the game and despite a Rangers comeback, New Zealand won.

The club won the Challenge Cup in 1910–11 when it beat Wigan 4–0 at the Willows, Salford in front of a crowd of 8,000.

Broughton's last game at Wheater's Field was against St. Helens on 9 April 1913 before moving to the Cliff on Lower Broughton Road, Higher Broughton.

Inter-war years
Broughton's highest league position between 1918 and 1939 was sixth in 1935–36 and its lowest, 27th in 1927–28, with Rangers generally finishing in the bottom half of the league. The only trophy won in the inter-war years was the 1920–21 Lancashire Cup, when they defeated Leigh 6–3 at Salford in front of 25,000 spectators.

In 1933, Broughton Rangers moved to Belle Vue Stadium, inside the speedway track. In 1941–42 the club dropped out of the wartime Lancashire League and did not return to league competition until 1945–46.

On 18 September 1935 Rangers signed future Lance Todd Trophy winner Frank Whitcombe from Army Rugby Union buying him out of the army for a fee of £100. Two years later in 1938, they sold him to Bradford Northern for £850, a world record fee for a front row forward.

Belle Vue Rangers
In 1946–47, Broughton was renamed Belle Vue Rangers. It made a Lancashire Cup final appearance in 1946–47 which ended in 9–3 defeat by Wigan at Station Road, Swinton. The club repeated this feat in 1947–48; losing again to Wigan 10–7 at Wilderspool, Warrington.

After the war, Rangers finished mid-table or above but after finishing 12th in 1950–51, Rangers finished 30th, second from bottom in 1954–55, its last season before the club folded.

Stadia

Belle Vue Stadium, Manchester, 1933–55
The Cliff, Higher Broughton, Salford, 1913–33
Wheater's Field, Lower Broughton, Salford, 1892–1913

Honours

Rugby Football League Championship: 1
1901–02
Challenge Cup: 2
1901–02, 1910–11
Lancashire Cup: 2
1906–07, 1920–21
Lancashire League: 2
1896–97, 1898–99

Players earning international caps while at Broughton Rangers/Belle Vue Rangers

 Billy Bentham won caps for England while at Broughton 1922 Wales, 1926 Wales, and won caps for Great Britain while at Broughton 1924 New Zealand (2 matches)
 George Bunter won a cap for England while at Broughton 1940 Wales
 "Bert" Cambridge won a cap for England while at Broughton 1935 France
 James "Jim" Clampitt won caps for England while at Broughton 1909 Wales, 1911 Wales, Australia, 1912 Wales, 1913 Wales, 1914 Wales won caps, and won caps for Great Britain while at Broughton 1908 New Zealand, 1911 Australia, 1914 New Zealand
 James "Jim" Cumberbatch won caps for England while at Broughton 1937 France, while at Newcastle 1938 Wales
 John "Jack" Flynn won a cap for England while at Broughton 1908 New Zealand
 John "Jack" Garvey won caps for England while at St. Helens 1933 Other Nationalities, while at Broughton 1936 Wales
 Elwyn Gwyther represented Wales XV (RU) while at Llanelli RFC in the 'Victory International' non-Test matches between December 1945 and April 1946, and won caps for Wales (RL) while at Belle Vue Rangers, and Leeds 1947...1953 15-caps, and won caps for Great Britain (RL) while at Belle Vue Rangers in 1947 against New Zealand (2 matches), in 1950 against Australia (3 matches), and in 1951 against New Zealand
 Andrew Hogg won caps for England while at Broughton 1908 Wales, New Zealand, and won caps for Great Britain while at Broughton 1908 New Zealand won caps for Other Nationalities while at Broughton ?-caps
 Edward "Ned" Jones won a cap for Wales while at Broughton Rangers 1913 1-cap
 Glyn Jones won a cap for Wales while at Broughton Rangers 1946 1-cap
 Stan McCormick won caps for England while at Belle Vue 1948 Wales, France, while at St. Helens 1949 Wales, France, 1951 Wales, 1953 France (2 matches), Wales, and won caps for Great Britain while at Belle Vue 1948 Australia (2 matches), while at St. Helens Australia
 Doug Phillips won caps for Wales while at Oldham and Belle Vue Rangers 1945...1951 9-caps, and won caps, and won caps for Great Britain while at Oldham in 1946 against Australia (3 matches), and while at Belle Vue Rangers in 1950 against Australia
 Robert "Bob" Poole won a cap for England while at Broughton 1905 Other Nationalities
 John "Jack" Price won caps for England while at Broughton 1921 Australia, while at Wigan 1922 Wales, 1924 Other Nationalities, and won caps for Great Britain while at Broughton 1921–22 Australia (2 matches), while at Wigan 1924 Australia (2 matches), New Zealand (2 matches)
 Ray Price won caps for Wales while at Belle Vue Rangers 1948...1953 6-caps, and won caps for Great Britain while at Warrington in 1954 against Australia, and New Zealand (2 matches), in 1955 against New Zealand, in 1956 against Australia (3 matches), and in 1957 against France (2 matches)
 Arthur "Artie" V. Royle won a cap for England (RU) while at Broughton in 1889 against New Zealand Natives
 George Ruddick won caps for Wales while at Broughton Rangers 1908...1910 3-caps, and won caps for Great Britain while at Broughton Rangers in 1908 against New Zealand (2 matches), and in 1910 against Australia, and Australasia
 Robert Seddon won caps for England (RU) while at Broughton Rangers in 1887 against Wales, Ireland and Scotland. He was also the first captain of a British Isles team in 1888 and died on the tour.
 Billy Stott (1946 Challenge Cup Winner and 1946 Lance Todd Trophy Winner with while at Wakefield Trinity) won a cap for England while at Broughton 1936 Wales
 Alfred Teggin won caps for England (RU) while at Broughton Rangers in 1884 against Ireland, in 1885 against Wales, in 1886 against Ireland and Scotland, and in 1887 against Ireland, and Scotland
 Ernest "Ernie" Thompson won a cap for England while at Broughton 1936 Wales
 Melbourne "Mel" Tierney won a cap for Wales while at Belle Vue Rangers 1953 1-cap
 Frank Whitcombe won caps for Wales while at Broughton Rangers, and Bradford Northern 1938...1948 14-caps, and won caps for Great Britain while at Bradford Northern in 1946 against Australia (2 matches). Lance Todd Trophy winner at Wembley 1948
 Robert "Bob" Wilson won a cap for England while at Broughton 1905 Other Nationalities

Other notable players

 Edward Arthur Ashworh  1945–46
 Eric Ayles 
 William H. "Billy" Barlow 1911 Challenge Cup winner
 James Leonard Battersby  mid-1920s, also North Sydney
 George Beatty 
 Harry Dagnan 
 David "Dai" Morgan Davies
 Derek Day 
 William "Billy" Dingsdale
 George Dixon
 John "Jack" Elwyn Evans
 Jim Featherstone
 Maurice Gallagher 
 Albert Gregory 
 Bryn Howells
 Bill Hunt 
 David James
 Evan James
 Jack Mannion 
 Edward Melling
 Dai Morgan 
 Harry Pimblett 
 Stanley Powell
 Dai Rees 
 Tommy Rees
 J. Robertson Lancashire against Middlesex at The Oval on Saturday 12 March 1887
 J. Scott 
 Thomas Steele (VC)
 Billy Teall
 Jack Tonge 
 Silas Warwick

References
Notes

Bibliography

Sport in the City of Salford
Rugby league teams in Greater Manchester
Defunct rugby league teams in England
Defunct English rugby union teams
Sports clubs disestablished in 1955
Rugby clubs established in 1877
Rugby clubs disestablished in 1955
Founder members of the Northern Rugby Football Union
1877 establishments in England
1955 disestablishments in England
English rugby league teams